The Chicu Cabinet was a Cabinet of Moldova, led by Ion Chicu. It was formed on 14 November 2019 two days after the Sandu Cabinet led by Maia Sandu was ousted in a vote of no confidence. With the support of just over 60% of MPs in the Parliament of Moldova, Chicu was approved as a replacement Prime Minister. The Cabinet was dissolved on 6 August 2021, being followed by Gavrilița Cabinet.

Composition 

The Başkan (Governor) of Gagauzia is elected by universal, equal, direct, secret and free suffrage on an alternative basis for a term of 4 years. One and the same person can be a governor for no more than two consecutive terms. The Başkan of Gagauzia is confirmed as a member of the Moldovan government by a decree of the President of Moldova.

References

External links
 Cabinet of Ministers

 

Moldova cabinets
2019 establishments in Moldova
Cabinets established in 2019
2021 disestablishments in Moldova
Cabinets disestablished in 2021